Rondinella  is an Italian wine grape variety. Rondinella always appears in these wines blended with Corvina (which DNA evidence has shown to be a parent variety), as a secondary constituent along with Corvinone and Molinara. The grape has rather neutral flavors but is favored by growers due to its prolific yields. The vine is very resistant to grape disease and produces grapes that, while they do not necessarily have high sugar levels, do dry out well for use in the production of Valpolicella straw wine styles such as Recioto and Amarone.

References

Red wine grape varieties
Wine grapes of Italy
Wine grapes of Veneto